The Deep Note is the sound trademark of THX Ltd., being a distinctive synthesized crescendo that glissandos from a relatively narrow frequency spread (about 200–400 Hz) to a broader frequency spread (of about three octaves). It was created by James A. Moorer, a former employee of Lucasfilm's Computer Division in late 1982. The sound is used on trailers for THX-certified movie theaters, home video releases, video games, and in-car entertainment systems.

The Deep Note was partially previewed on the opening track of the 1983 album The Digital Domain: A Demonstration, where it was included among sound effects that were combined with the Deep Note itself. The Deep Note debuted later that same year at the premiere of Return of the Jedi in Los Angeles.

Description 

The U.S. trademark registration for the first version of the sound contains this description of it:

In 1992, the Deep Note was registered as a trademark by the United States Patent and Trademark Office.

The sound is perceived as louder than it actually is; sound designer and re-recording mixer Gary Rydstrom explains that, "from a technical standpoint, 'Deep Note' just feels loud because it has a spectrum of frequencies that grows from small to large."

Although Moorer had initially claimed that the score consisted of about 20,000 lines of code, he subsequently corrected the statement and elaborated:

Millennium version (2000) 

In fall 1999, THX released the trailer "Broadway 2000" for use of the Dolby Digital Surround EX sound system. As a result, an entirely new Deep Note was made from scratch. In this version of the Deep Note, new voices were made doing the similar process while voices from the previous version can be briefly heard. Aside from the trailer's appearance in theaters as well as on The Adventures of Indiana Jones DVD box set, the only other trailer that also uses this version of the Deep Note was a trailer made specially for the post-2000 home media releases of Terminator 2: Judgment Day.

Remastered version (2005–present) 

In May 2005, to coincide with the theatrical release of Star Wars: Episode III – Revenge of the Sith, THX introduced a new trailer called "The Science of Sensation", which featured a new version of the Deep Note, which is similar to the original, but voices from the "Broadway 2000" trailer were mixed together.

Regenerated version (2015) 

In April 2015, THX introduced a new trailer called Eclipse, which was accompanied by an updated, more powerful version of the Deep Note, also created by Moorer. This version of the Deep Note was created entirely digitally so it could play on Dolby Surround 7.1, Dolby Atmos, and DTS:X systems, and Moorer created 30-second, 45-second, and 60-second versions of it. Moorer used around eighty voices in the remake, as opposed to thirty in the original 1983 version. He stated in an interview, "That’s the way I wanted it to sound originally. I think it’s as far as you can take it." Eclipse would be the only appearance of the regenerated version as starting with trailers Sphere and Genesis (both made to utilize the 4K video resolution), the remastered Deep Note was used instead.

Previous works 

Prior to the creation of the Deep Note, several other works made use of similar techniques of frequency spread. A recognized predecessor is a section in the Beatles' 1967 song "A Day in the Life", using a full orchestra. Unlike in the Deep Note, the resolving high chord is never held, but instead brought to a stop. Moorer has admitted that both "A Day in the Life" and a fugue in B minor by Bach were sources of inspiration for the Deep Note.

In their book Analog Days, Trevor Pinch and Frank Trocco say that the track "Spaced", from the 1970 Beaver & Krause album In a Wild Sanctuary, was "copied by a famous Marin County film company" to introduce its film presentations, although they do not identify the company. The authors quote synthesizer builder Tom Oberheim as saying that the original analog form is much richer than the "digital perfection" evident in the sound logo so familiar to cinema-goers.

Original score 

In 2018, THX released an image of the original 30-voice score, with notes.

Lawsuit 
Lucasfilm, then-owner of THX, sued rapper Dr. Dre in 2000 for using an unauthorized cover of Deep Note in the opening track "Lolo (Intro)" on his 1999 album 2001.

In popular culture 

In a 1994 episode of The Simpsons titled "Burns' Heir," there is a parody gag of the Deep Note, with the Simpson family in the theater watching Siskel & Ebert: The Movie. The Deep Note causes multiple things in the theater to explode seemingly from acoustic resonance, and ends with Grampa Simpson yelling "Turn it up!" THX executives liked the parody so much that the scene was later remade into an actual THX movie trailer, with the scene being redone in a widescreen aspect ratio.

References

External links 
 Deep Note mp3 at the United States Patent and Trademark Office
 Twenty Thousand Hertz podcast episodes about Deep Note: Part 1 and Part 2

Electronic music
Film sound production
Lucasfilm
Sound effects
Sound trademarks
Internet memes
1982 works
1983 introductions